Maurice Sznycer (1921 in Poland – 29 July 2010, Paris) was a French historian, philologist, archaeologist, epigrapher and specialist of the Semitic world.

His work focused as much on near East world as on ancient Carthage.

He lived as a Partisan during the 1940s, along with his brother, Selim.

After he was elected "directeur d'études" at the École pratique des hautes études (IVth section), he published in the 1970s several reference books and articles devoted to the Phoenicians in Cyprus, the Phoenician-Punic expansion in the western Mediterranean or Phoenician toponyms in the Western Mediterranean.

References

External links 
 Maurice Sznycer on Data.bnf.fr
 Publications by Maurice Sznycer on Persée
 Maurice Sznycer on IdRef

French epigraphers
French archaeologists
French philologists
20th-century French historians
Academic staff of the École pratique des hautes études
1921 births
2010 deaths
Phoenician-Punic studies
Polish emigrants to France